Pablo Daniel Magnín (born 25 April 1990) is an Argentine footballer currently playing for FBC Melgar in the Peruvian Primera División.

References
 
 
 

1990 births
Living people
Argentine footballers
Argentine expatriate footballers
Association football forwards
Unión de Santa Fe footballers
Instituto footballers
San Luis de Quillota footballers
San Martín de San Juan footballers
Club Atlético Temperley footballers
Club Atlético Sarmiento footballers
Club Atlético Tigre footballers
FBC Melgar footballers
Chilean Primera División players
Argentine Primera División players
Expatriate footballers in Chile
Argentine expatriate sportspeople in Chile
Sportspeople from Santa Fe Province
Argentine people of French descent